Sukhmail Mathon (born May 1, 1998) is an American basketball player who last played for the Landstede Hammers of the BNXT League. He competed in college for the Boston University Terriers of the Patriot League where he was the 2022 Patriot League Player of the Year.

High school career 
As a senior at Holderness School in Holderness, New Hampshire, Mathon scored over 1,000 points and he was a team captain. He was an unranked recruit and he committed to play college basketball at Boston University.

College career 
Mathon played in every game in his freshman and sophomore years. He made his first start against Northeastern. In his junior year, Mathon led the Terriers to the 2020 Patriot League tournament championship but due to the COVID-19 pandemic, the season was cancelled before the NCAA tournament. As a senior, Mathon was named to the Patriot League All-Defensive Team. As a graduate student, Mathon would have a breakout year in which he ranked top ten in the NCAA in rebounds. His efforts led to him being named the Patriot League Player of the Year and being named to the First-team All-Patriot League. Mathon's college career ended on a 46–76 loss to Middle Tennessee State in the 2022 CBI tournament.

Professional career 
On July 11, 2022, Mathon signed his first professional contract with Dutch club Landstede Hammers of the BNXT League.

Career statistics 

|-
| style="text-align:left;"| 2017–18
| style="text-align:left;"| Boston University
| 31 || 0 || 11.5 || .456 || 0 || .500 || 2.9 || 0.8 || .1 || .3 || 2.6
|-
| style="text-align:left;"| 2018–19
| style="text-align:left;"| Boston University
| 33 || 24 || 16.3 || .516 || .222 || .333 || 3.6 || .9 || .3 || .3 || 3.2
|-
| style="text-align:left;"| 2019–20
| style="text-align:left;"| Boston University
| 34 || 22 || 16.7 || .555 || .222 || .591 || 4.7 || .9 || .2 || .3 || 4.6
|-
| style="text-align:left;"| 2020–21
| style="text-align:left;"| Boston University
| 18 || 18 || 27.0 || .559 || .250 || .774 || 8.2 || 2.0 || .5 || 1.3 || 11.2
|-
| style="text-align:left;"| 2021–22
| style="text-align:left;"| Boston University
| 35 || 35 || 30.1 || .530 || .200 || .785 || 10.2 || 1.5 || .6 || .7 || 15.1
|-
| style="text-align:center;" colspan="2"| Career
| 151 || 99 || 19.9 || .530 || .222 || .732 || 5.8 || 1.2 || .3 || .5 || 7.1

References

External links 
Boston University Terriers bio

1998 births
Living people
American expatriate basketball people in the Netherlands
American men's basketball players
Basketball players from Pennsylvania
Boston University Terriers men's basketball players
Holderness School alumni
Landstede Hammers players
People from Luzerne County, Pennsylvania
Power forwards (basketball)